In mathematics, a linearised polynomial (or q-polynomial) is a polynomial for which the exponents of all the constituent monomials are powers of q and the coefficients come from some extension field of the finite field of order q.

We write a typical example as

This special class of polynomials is important from both a theoretical and an applications viewpoint. The highly structured nature of their roots makes these roots easy to determine.

Properties
 The map  is a linear map over any field containing Fq.
 The set of roots of L is an Fq-vector space and is closed under the q-Frobenius map.
 Conversely, if U is any Fq-linear subspace of some finite field containing Fq, then the polynomial that vanishes exactly on U is a linearised polynomial.
 The set of linearised polynomials over a given field is closed under addition and composition of polynomials.

Symbolic multiplication

In general, the product of two linearised polynomials will not be a linearized polynomial, but since the composition of two linearised polynomials results in a linearised polynomial, composition may be used as a replacement for multiplication and, for this reason, composition is often called symbolic multiplication in this setting. Notationally, if L1(x) and L2(x) are linearised polynomials we define  when this point of view is being taken.

Associated polynomials
More specifically, l(x) is called the conventional q-associate of L(x), and L(x) is the linearised q-associate of l(x).

q-polynomials over Fq
Linearised polynomials with coefficients in Fq have additional properties which make it possible to define symbolic division, symbolic reducibility and symbolic factorization. Two important examples of this type of linearised polynomial are the Frobenius automorphism  and the trace function 

In this special case it can be shown that, as an operation, symbolic multiplication is commutative, associative and distributes over ordinary addition. Also, in this special case, we can define the operation of symbolic division. If L(x) and L1(x) are linearised polynomials over Fq, we say that L1(x) symbolically divides L(x) if there exists a linearised polynomial L2(x) over Fq for which:  

If L1(x) and L2(x) are linearised polynomials over Fq with conventional q-associates l1(x) and l2(x) respectively, then L1(x) symbolically divides L2(x) if and only if l1(x) divides l2(x). Furthermore, 
L1(x) divides L2(x) in the ordinary sense in this case.

A linearised polynomial L(x) over Fq of degree > 1 is symbolically irreducible over Fq if the only symbolic decompositions

with Li over Fq are those for which one of the factors has degree 1. Note that a symbolically irreducible polynomial is always reducible in the ordinary sense since any linearised polynomial of degree > 1 has the nontrivial factor x. A linearised polynomial L(x) over Fq is symbolically irreducible if and only if its conventional q-associate l(x) is irreducible over Fq.

Every q-polynomial L(x) over Fq of degree > 1 has a symbolic factorization into symbolically irreducible polynomials over Fq and this factorization is essentially unique (up to rearranging factors and multiplying by nonzero elements of Fq.)

For example, consider the 2-polynomial L(x) = x16 + x8 + x2 + x over F2 and its conventional 2-associate l(x) = x4 + x3 + x + 1. The factorization into irreducibles of l(x) = (x2 + x + 1)(x + 1)2 in F2[x], gives the symbolic factorization

Affine polynomials

Notes

References
  
 

Polynomials